Kantza (Greek: Καντζα) may refer to the following places in Greece:

Kantza, Attica, a settlement located east of Paiania, East Attica
Paiania–Kantza station, an Athens Suburban Railway and Athens Metro station
Stefani, Preveza, previously Kanza